Brandau is a surname. Notable people with the surname include:
 Art Brandau (1922–2001), American football player
 Butch Brandau (1899–1987), American football player
 Elisabeth Brandau (born 1985), German cyclist
 James F. Brandau (1933-2012), American helicopter pilot
 Matilde Brandau ( 1870–1948), Chilean lawyer and educator